Leif Garrett is the debut studio album by American singer-actor Leif Garrett, released in 1977 by Atlantic. Garrett had recorded the album at Atlantic Studios while staying in New York City, and released the album at the age of 15.

Track listing

Personnel 
Leif Garrett – vocals
Jay Graydon – guitars
Mitch Holder - guitars
Art Munson - guitars
Jim Hughart - bass guitar
Greg Mathieson - keyboards
Michael Lloyd - keyboards, backing vocals
John D'Andrea – saxophone 
John Rosenberg - Horns
Sid Sharp - strings
Rick Schloßer - drums
Ron Krasinski - drums
Alan Estes - percussion
Jim Haas - backing vocals
Ron Hicklin - backing vocals
Stan Farber - backing vocals
Tom Bahler - backing vocals

Production 
Michael Lloyd – producer, mixing
Humberto Gatica – engineer, mixing
John D'Andrea – arranger
John Rosenberg – director
Sid Sharp – director

Charts

Weekly charts

Year-end charts

Certifications

References 

1977 debut albums
Leif Garrett albums
Atlantic Records albums
Albums produced by Michael Lloyd (music producer)